Calexico International Airport  is a city-owned public-use airport located one mile (1.6 km) west of the central business district of Calexico, in Imperial County, California. The airport is mostly used for general aviation and to facilitate border crossing.

Facilities and aircraft 
For the 12-month period ending December 31, 2004, the airport had 12,240 aircraft operations, an average of 33 per day: 93% general aviation and 7% air taxi. At that time there were 23 aircraft based at this airport: 83% single-engine and 17% multi-engine.

References

External links
 Calexico International Airport page at City of Calexico website

Airports in Imperial County, California
Calexico, California